The 2008–09 season was the 120th season of competitive football by Celtic.

Overview
Celtic went into the 2008–09 season defending their Scottish Premier League title, which they won for the third consecutive time in 2007–08.

They also entered the UEFA Champions League directly at the group stage, as well as taking part in the two domestic cup competitions, the Scottish Cup and the Scottish League Cup.

To prepare for the Season, Celtic took part in two Pre-Season Tournaments; the Algarve Challenge Cup in Faro, Portugal, where they finished bottom, having faced Middlesbrough and Cardiff City, and the Feyenoord Jubilee Tournament in Rotterdam, where they finished second, having faced Tottenham Hotspur and host club Feyenoord.

The campaign

League campaign
The Championship flag was unfurled before Celtic's first League game, against St Mirren at Celtic Park on 10 August by Rosemary Burns, the widow of former Celtic player Tommy Burns, who had died of skin cancer at the end of season 2007–08. Celtic won the game 1–0, through a Barry Robson penalty, getting their Campaign off to a winning start.

Celtic finished second in the SPL table at the end of the season, eventually finishing four points behind champions Rangers. This was despite at one point having built up a seven-point lead over Rangers. This lead was squandered though, Celtic dropping points to Dundee United, Inverness Caledonian Thistle, Motherwell, Rangers themselves, and on two occasions to both Hibernian and Hearts.

One day after the final league game of the season, a 0–0 draw with Hearts at Celtic Park, it was announced that Gordon Strachan would leave as manager of Celtic with immediate effect. This brought to an end Strachan's four-year spell as manager, during which he guided the club to three SPL titles, one Scottish Cup and two Scottish League Cups. He also guided the club twice into the last 16 of the Champions League, losing out to A.C. Milan and Barcelona respectively.

European campaign
Celtic, as Scottish champions, qualified directly for the UEFA Champions League, where they were the sole Scottish side as Rangers were knocked out in the second qualifying round by FBK Kaunas, meaning Celtic received all the TV money allocated to Scotland.

Celtic were in Pot 3 for the group stage draw, which took place in Monaco on 28 August. They were drawn with Manchester United, Villarreal and Aalborg. The first game, a home tie against Aalborg, finished in a goalless draw. The next game, away to Villarreal ended in a 1–0 defeat, which was followed by a 3–0 defeat away to Manchester United. Next up, at home, Celtic drew 1–1 with Manchester United, with Scott McDonald putting Celtic in the lead in the 13th minute, only for Ryan Giggs to equalise for Manchester United in the 84th minute. A disappointing 2–1 defeat to Aalborg in Denmark saw Celtic's European aspirations end, despite having taken the lead through Barry Robson. Nonetheless, Celtic rallied to end their campaign on a high with a 2–0 victory over Villarreal at Celtic Park.

Domestic cups
Celtic entered the Scottish League Cup at the third round proper (the last 16 stage) and the Scottish Cup at the fourth round proper (the Round of 32). The club beat Livingston 4–0 in the third round of the League Cup on 23 September, and travelled to Kilmarnock on 28 October, beating them 3–1 and qualifying for the semi-finals, where they faced Dundee United at Hampden Park on 28 January. After a 0–0 draw in extra time, Celtic won a penalty shoot-out 11–10 to set up a final against Rangers on 15 March. The team won the 2009 Scottish League Cup Final 2–0 aet at Hampden, with Darren O'Dea and Aiden McGeady getting the goals.

The fourth round of the Scottish Cup took place on 10 January, with Celtic beating Dundee at Celtic Park. In the fifth round, Celtic hosted Queen's Park on 7 February, beating them 2–1. In the quarter-finals, Celtic lost 1–0 at St Mirren on 7 March.

Competitions

Scottish Premier League

UEFA Champions League

Scottish League Cup

*Celtic won the match 11–10 on penalties

Scottish Cup

Player statistics

Appearances and goals

List of squad players, including number of appearances by competition

|}

Top scorers

Team statistics

League table

Technical staff

Transfers

In

Out

See also
 List of Celtic F.C. seasons

References

External links
Celtic FC website

2008-09
Scottish football clubs 2008–09 season